La Cabina is a 1972 television film directed by Spanish director Antonio Mercero, and written by himself and José Luis Garci, starring José Luis López Vázquez. It first aired on 13 December 1972 on Televisión Española. In the 35-minute film, a man becomes trapped in a telephone booth, while passersby seem unable to help him.

The film won the 1973 International Emmy Award for Fiction, the only Spanish programme to have won it. It was uploaded on YouTube in August 2019 by RTVE Archivo.

Plot
The film opens with workmen installing a phone booth in the middle of a square. Later, a man takes his son to the school bus. He enters the phone booth to make a call and the door slowly closes behind him. The man realizes that the phone does not work, so he tries to leave, only to discover that the door is stuck. He tries desperately to get it open, but nothing works.

Eventually two business men come by and try to help him out, but to no avail. This gathers the attention of many passers-by who begin to congregate and watch the action. Several people (including a strong man, a repair man and a police officer) try to open the door but it remains stuck. Eventually a firefighter is just about to try to break open the glass roof of the phone booth when the phone booth company appears. They unbolt the booth and take it away on their truck, with the man still inside it. The crowd cheers and waves him away.

The man watches frantically as he is carted across town. He tries to scream for help from people but everyone, apart from some dwarves, just smile and wave. There are allusions to his fate along the way, with a dwarf holding a ship in a bottle and a glass coffin containing a corpse being mourned. Eventually the truck stops next to another truck also carrying a man stuck in a phone booth. The two men try to communicate but cannot. After many hours the truck arrives at a massive underground warehouse. The phone booth is lifted up in the air by a giant magnet and the truck drives away. The phone booth is carried by a forklift through the warehouse, which is full of phone booths containing decaying remains of other trapped citizens. The man struggles in fear but cannot escape. The forklift drops him and leaves. The man looks to his right and sees the trapped man he saw on his way to the warehouse, who has strangled himself with the telephone cord. In other booths lie corpses in various states of decay. The man collapses out of frame in despair. The film ends with the phone booth company setting up a similar booth in the same park.

References

External links
 
 Chaotic Cinema - Summary and many still images
The film on YouTube

1972 films
1970s Spanish-language films
Spanish short films
Spanish black comedy films
Madrid in fiction
Spain in fiction
1972 horror films
RTVE shows
Spanish science fiction horror films
Spanish science fiction thriller films
Spanish television films